James C. Stitt (1866-1949) was an architect based in Norfolk, Nebraska.

At least five of his works are listed on the U.S. National Register of Historic Places.

He was born September 28, 1866, in Medusa, New York.
He died January 10, 1949.

His business was eventually absorbed into that of Norfolk architect Elbert B. Watson (1879-1963).

Works include:
Cedar County Courthouse (1891), Broadway Ave. between Centre and Franklin Sts. Hartington, Nebraska, NRHP-listed 
Norfolk Carnegie Library (1910), 803 W. Norfolk Ave. Norfolk, Nebraska, NRHP-listed
Plainview Carnegie Library (1917), 102 S. Main St. Plainview, Nebraska, NRHP-listed
Stubbs-Ballah House (1917), NRHP-listed
Miller Hall (1920), 10th and Main Sts. Chadron, Nebraska, NRHP-listed
Library (1929), 10th and Main Sts. Chadron, Nebraska, NRHP-listed

References

External links
James C. Stitt (1866-1949), at Nebraska State Historical Society

Architects from Nebraska
People from Norfolk, Nebraska
People from Rensselaerville, New York
1949 deaths
1866 births